Electric Easy is a science fiction podcast and musical produced by QCode starring Kesha, Chloe Bailey, and Mason Gooding.

Background 
The podcast was produced by QCode and created by Vanya Asher. The show was produced using Dolby Atmos. The podcast was recorded remotely during the COVID-19 pandemic. Each episode is told from a different character's point of view. The podcast is set in a futuristic Los Angeles. The podcast stars Kesha as an electric named Zephyr, who works as the MC at a nightclub called Electric Easy. Chloe Bailey stars as an electric named Vector, who is a performer at Electric Easy. Mason Gooding stars as Lucky, who is a gang member. The show was nominated for a Webby Award in 2022. Morgan McNaught wrote in The A.V. Club that "the audio is sexy and lush".

References

External links 

Audio podcasts
2021 podcast debuts
2021 podcast endings
Scripted podcasts
Science fiction podcasts
Musical theatre podcasts
American podcasts